Notocypraea angustata is a species of sea snail, a cowry, a marine gastropod mollusk in the family Cypraeidae, the cowries.


Distribution
This species and its subspecies occur in the seas along southern Australia.

References
 Lorenz F. & Hubert A. (2000) A guide to worldwide cowries. Edition 2. Hackenheim: Conchbooks. 584 pp
 Lorenz F. (2005) Taxonomic notes on two poorly known species of Notocypraea (Gastropoda: Cypraeidae). Visaya 1(5):16-21

External links
 Biolib
 WoRMS

Cypraeidae
Gastropods described in 1791
Taxa named by Johann Friedrich Gmelin